Honey West is a ground-breaking American crime drama television series that aired on ABC from September 17, 1965, to April 8, 1966, as an entry in the 1965–1966 television season. Based upon a series of novels that had launched in 1957, the series starred Anne Francis as female private detective Honey West and John Ericson as her partner Sam Bolt. The popular series was historic in that it marked the first time a woman played the lead character in a network TV series with her character's name as the title (the syndicated Annie Oakley had a similar distinction in its category a decade earlier). 

Thirty half-hour episodes were produced. The entire series is available on DVD.

Creation

The Honey West character was created by Gloria and Forrest E. "Skip" Fickling under the pseudonym "G.G. Fickling" in the late 1950s. Skip had been a United States Army Air Forces air gunner during World War II, then enlisted in the U.S. Marine Corps Reserve after the war, when he was called back into active service during the Korean War. The G.G. represented the initials of his wife, Gloria Gautraud, whom he married in 1949, with initials used so the sex of the author would remain vague. Though Gloria said that most of the writing was done by Forrest, Forrest said Gloria's ideas were used to make a plausible female character, with Gloria also providing Honey's dress sense. Forrest told the Los Angeles Times, "I first thought of Marilyn Monroe, and then I thought of [fictional detective] Mike Hammer and decided to put the two together ... We thought the most used name for someone you really like is Honey. And she lives in the West, so there was her name."

West was one of the first female "private eyes" to ever appear on television. Francis first played West in the second-season episode of Burke's Law, entitled "Who Killed the Jackpot?", broadcast on April 21, 1965, which led to this series being commissioned as a spin-off. West drove a Jaguar convertible in the Burke's Law episode and was twice referred to as the "private eyeful". She carried a gun and was trained in martial arts. Honey West was intended to be the American equivalent of characters Cathy Gale and Emma Peel in the British series The Avengers.

Producer Aaron Spelling's first choice for the role of Honey was Honor Blackman, whom he had seen in England playing Cathy Gale on The Avengers and as Pussy Galore in Goldfinger. Blackman turned down the role. Anne Francis' fashions in the Honey role were by Nolan Miller, and her action scenes choreographed by Gene LeBell. The series was developed for television by Gwen Bagni and Paul Dubov, writers of several Burke's Law episodes.

Synopsis 

As in the Burke's Law episode introducing her, West has a partner and man-Friday, Sam Bolt (John Ericson), who communicates with Honey via a radio hidden in her lipstick case. In the television series, she keeps a pet ocelot named Bruce. (In "The Fun-Fun Killer", which originally aired on March 4, 1966, the series Daktari, set in Africa, is showing on Honey's TV and Honey asks, "Oh Bruce, why do we always have to watch your show?")

Honey's alluring feline qualities were reflected in her animal-print wardrobe and apartment decor. For sneaking around at night and engaging in energetic fight scenes, she wears a black fabric bodystocking reminiscent of Emma Peel's leather jumpsuit. Like Peel's Lotus Elan sports car, Honey's similar-looking AC Cobra convertible emphasized her independence and vitality. Although the racy content of the novels was excised for television, West often went on solo undercover missions that required a provocative or revealing outfit.

She uses a number of James Bond-like gimmicks: a high-tech surveillance van, an exploding compact, a garter-belt gas mask, and tear-gas earrings. West is a black-belt in judo, as is Sam, who is an ex-Marine.

Some episodes of this series, including the final one, were scripted by Richard Levinson and William Link, who would later be affiliated with such noted series as Columbo and Murder, She Wrote.

Cast 
 Anne Francis as Honey West
 John Ericson as Sam Bolt
 Irene Hervey as Aunt Meg

Guest stars 
Among those appearing during the series' 30-episode run were Joe Don Baker, James Best, Lloyd Bochner, Edd Byrnes, Dick Clark, Charlene Holt, Nancy Kovack, Kevin McCarthy, Maureen McCormick, Bert Parks, Michael J. Pollard, Wayne Rogers, Everett Sloane and Bobby Sherman.

Trivia

Episode 3, "The Abominable Snowman" has a plot where cocaine is being smuggled inside snow globes, and is one of the earliest references in popular TV culture to cocaine as "snow".

Episodes

Reception
Honey West was cancelled after just one season. This came down to two factors: competition from Gomer Pyle, U.S.M.C., and financial considerations. ABC executives reportedly decided it would be cheaper to import The Avengers and air it in the same time slot rather than produce Honey West at a significantly steeper price. Nonetheless, Francis received nominations for a Golden Globe Award and a Best Actress Emmy for her performance.

The series was rerun in the late 1990s as part of TV Land's inaugural lineup, and occasionally airs on Decades.

Home media 
In 2006, Delta Home Entertainment released the entire series on Region 0 DVD in the UK.

VCI Entertainment issued a North American Region 1 DVD release of the series in September 2008.

Print adaptations 
Gold Key Comics issued a one-shot comic book adaptation of the television series in 1966, scripted by Paul S. Newman, with artwork by Jack Sparling. Overlook Press published "Honey West - This Girl For Hire", a novel, in 2005. From 2010-2013, Moonstone (comics) produced Honey West comics, a hardcover novel, and a two paperbacks. BearManor Media, in 2011, published a profusely illustrated 228-page tribute to the series, examining it in detail with interviews of the surviving cast members, and listings of websites, addresses, bibliographies, episode synopses, and an appendix.

References

External links 
 
 
 Honey West at the Museum of Broadcast Communications
 Pierce, J. Kingston. "A Taste of Honey." The Rap Sheet, July 29, 2009.

1965 American television series debuts
1966 American television series endings
1960s American crime drama television series
1960s American mystery television series
American Broadcasting Company original programming
Black-and-white American television shows
American detective television series
English-language television shows
Television shows based on American novels
Television series by Four Star Television
Television shows adapted into comics